Old St. Andrew's Parish Church is a historic church in Charleston, South Carolina. It is the oldest surviving church building in South Carolina.

The parish was one of ten Anglican churches established by South Carolina's Church Act of 1706, and the original church was built the same year. It was expanded to its current cruciform plan in 1723. The church was disused from 1891 to 1948, since which it has undergone steady restoration. It was added to the National Register of Historic Places in 1973.

In 2013, the parish left the Episcopal Church and joined what subsequently became the Anglican Diocese of South Carolina, but in 2022 the church building was ordered to be returned to the Episcopal Church by the Supreme Court of South Carolina. On 17 August 2022, the South Carolina Supreme Court affirmed the property rights of six parishes, including Old St. Andrew's, of the Anglican Diocese of South Carolina, who will be able to keep them because of this decision.

See also
List of the oldest churches in the United States
 List of the oldest buildings in South Carolina

References

External links
Old St. Andrews Website
Saint Andrew's Episcopal Church Photos and history

Anglican churches in South Carolina
Churches on the National Register of Historic Places in South Carolina
Churches completed in 1706
Churches in Charleston, South Carolina
National Register of Historic Places in Charleston, South Carolina
18th-century Episcopal church buildings
Colonial South Carolina
English-American culture in South Carolina
1706 establishments in South Carolina
Anglican Church in North America church buildings in the United States
Former Episcopal church buildings in South Carolina
Anglican realignment congregations